Suyoi bin Osman (born 15 February 1952), sometimes referred to as Pehin Dato Suyoi, is a Bruneian politician and diplomat who was the Minister of Health (MoH) from 2005 to 2010, the Minister of Development (MoD) from 2010 to 2015, the Minister of Education (MoE) from 2015 to 2018, and currently a member of the Brunei Legislative Council (LegCo).

Biography

Early life and education 
Suyoi is born in Kuala Belait on 15 February 1952, and was educated at the University of East Anglia (BA Development Studies, 1975), the University of London (Certificate in Education) and the Paul H. Nitze School of Advanced International Studies at Johns Hopkins University (Master of International Public Policy (MPP), 1986).

Political career 
Suyoi began serving as the Deputy Director of the Political Department in the Ministry of Foreign Affairs in 1984, the Bruneian Ambassador to France from 1991 to 1996, and as the Deputy Minister of Education in June 2004, he would visit Australia under the Department of Foreign Affairs and Trade Special Visits Program. He would be appointed as the Minister of Health from 2005 to 2010. During the World Health Organization (WHO)'s Fifty-ninth WHA on 22 May 2006, he was appointed as one of the vice presidents. Later in 2007, he stated that although there are only 32 people living with AIDS in Brunei, the number is nevertheless alarming considering the size and population of the nation. According to him in 2009, the tiny sultanate is clear of infection, and plans are in motion to increase its supply of the antiviral medication Tamiflu from the current 25 percent to 40 percent of the population of more than 380,000 people. 

He was rappointed as the Minister of Development from 2010 to 2015, replacing Abdullah Bakar. He stated in March 2013 that there is still a lack of interest among Bruneian property owners and that the government is having difficulty gauging the success of the strata title. In order to lessen floods, Tutong will have five retention basins created, he informed the LegCo on 17 March 2015. The following day, he was part of the Brunei delegation for the Ninth Meeting of Brunei-Singapore Cooperation on the Environment under the Annual Exchange of Visits. He attended the 11th Annual Brunei Darussalam Roundtable as the Deputy Chairman of the Autoriti Monetari Brunei Darussalam (AMBD) on 19 October 2015. He would then go on to state that both domestic and foreign market participants can rely on these advantages to take advantage of the numerous opportunities in the financial sector, particularly in the area of Islamic finance where their strong Islamic values are a great source of assurance to investors on our capacity and capability to provide Islamic financial services. 

On 22 October 2015, Suyoi became the 6th Minister of Education. The 48th President of the Southeast Asian Council of Ministers of Education (SEAMEO Council), Teerakiat Jaroensettasin, and his entourage were honoured at a dinner held by him on 9 February 2017. After obtaining consent from Sultan Hassanal Bolkiah on 20 January 2023, he was again appointed for the second time as a member of the LegCo.

Other appointments 
Pehin Dato Suyoi also held several other key positions such as the Special Chairman of the Committee to review the mechanism of zakat; Deputy Chairman of the Council of Universiti Brunei Darussalam (UBD); Member of the Brunei Darussalam Higher Education Committee; Board Member of the Al-Muhtadee Billah Mahkota Young Youth Fund Fund For Orphans; Advisor to the Handicapped Children's Association (CACA); Patron of Brunei Tennis Club.

Honours 
Suyoi was bestowed the title of Yang Berhormat (The Honorable) Pehin Orang Kaya Indera Pahlawan. Examples of honours given to him;

  Order of Setia Negara Brunei First Class (PSNB) – Dato Setia
  Order of Seri Paduka Mahkota Brunei Second Class (DPMB) – Dato Paduka
  Meritorious Service Medal (PJK)
  Service to State Medal (PIKB)
  Long Service Medal (PKL)

References

External links 

 2009 Interview with Suyoi Osman 
 2014 Interview with Suyoi Osman

1952 births
Living people
Alumni of the University of East Anglia
Alumni of the University of London
Paul H. Nitze School of Advanced International Studies alumni
Education ministers of Brunei
Health ministers of Brunei
Members of the Legislative Council of Brunei
Ambassadors of Brunei to France